This is a list of magazines published by the Japanese publishing company ASCII Media Works. After the merger of ASCII and MediaWorks on April 1, 2008, the two companies' active magazines continued publication. Most of their magazines center on anime, manga, bishōjo games, or video games. A large number of ASCII Media Works' magazines carry the title  which precedes the title of a given magazine; the Dengeki label is also used on publishing imprints, and contests held by the company, making it a well-known trademark for ASCII Media Works. Other magazines focus on computers and information technology.

Magazines

Active

Special editions

Discontinued

Special editions

See also
Enterbrain

References

External links
ASCII Media Works' official website 

 
Defunct magazines published in Japan
Video game magazines published in Japan
Lists of magazines
Monthly magazines published in Japan
Defunct computer magazines